Wrestling Dontaku 2021 was a professional wrestling event promoted by New Japan Pro-Wrestling (NJPW). The event took place on May 3 and 4, 2021, in Fukuoka, at the Fukuoka Kokusai Center. The event featured eleven matches, throughout both nights. In the main event of the first night Jay White defeated Hiroshi Tanahashi to win the NEVER Openweight Championship. In the second night's main event, Will Ospreay defeated Shingo Takagi to retain the IWGP World Heavyweight Championship. This was the seventeenth event under the Wrestling Dontaku name.

Production

Background 
Since 2020, NJPW has unable to run events with a full arena capacity due to COVID-19 restrictions.

Storylines 
Each night of Wrestling Dontaku 2021 will feature six professional wrestling matches that involved different wrestlers from pre-existing scripted feuds and storylines. Wrestlers portrayed villains, heroes, or less distinguishable characters in the scripted events that built tension and culminated in a wrestling match or series of matches.

Results

Night 1

Night 2

References

External links
The official New Japan Pro-Wrestling website

2021
2021 in professional wrestling
May 2021 sports events in Japan